Interstate 165 (I-165) is a spur from I-65 that provides access to Mobile, Alabama. As it is, I-165 terminates into Water Street, which itself terminates into an I-10 onramp less than  further. The route is elevated for its entire length.

Route description

I-165 begins at its northern terminus, an interchange with I-65. After that is an incomplete interchange (exit 1A) with Whistler Street and Price Avenue that is only accessible from the southbound lanes. It then has an incomplete interchange (exit 1B) with Wilson Avenue and Dr. Martin Luther King Jr. Drive that is only accessible from the southbound lanes. Shortly afterward, I-165 meets an incomplete interchange (exit 1C) with Price Avenue and Whistler Street that is only accessible from the northbound lanes. I-165 then meets U.S. Route 90 (US 90)/U.S. Route 98 Truck (US 98 Truck) at exit 2 on the Mobile–Prichard city line, and then the three highways curve concurrently to the south-southeast. It then has an incomplete interchange that leads to Conception Street Road. It is only accessible from the northbound lanes. Finally, I-165 reaches Beauregard Street, its southern terminus, where US 90/US 98 Truck split off. This interchange also includes Water Street, with leads to I-10.

History

I-165 began life as a planned Interstate 210 (I-210). Many problems, including community opposition and access to the Mobile waterfront, prevented the freeway from reaching its intended southern terminus at I-10; I-165 ends about  short of I-10 and becomes Water Street. Since the road had no connection to I-10, the number 210 was no longer applicable to the freeway, so 165 was chosen instead.

Construction of the freeway commenced in early 1991 and was originally slated for opening in April 1995. Costing $240 million (equivalent to $ in ) to complete, the route was officially opened to the public at 5:00 pm on October 28, 1994. In attendance at the ceremony were former governor Jim Folsom Jr., US Representative Sonny Callahan, and Federal Highway Administration head Rodney Slate. Upon its completion, it saved commuters traveling between downtown Mobile and the northern suburbs along I-65 an average of nine minutes. While still under construction in 1993, efforts to name the freeway in honor of Mobile baseball great Satchel Paige never materialized.

Its construction resulted in the demolition of many structures within downtown Prichard, including such landmarks as the main public library and fire station.

Exit list

See also

References

External links

 
 Alabama @ SouthEastRoads.com - Interstate 165
 Kurumi - I-165 Alabama

65-1 (Alabama)
65-1
2 Alabama
1 (Alabama)
Transportation in Mobile County, Alabama
Transportation in Mobile, Alabama